Dave (also known as Dave.com) is a leading US neobank and a pioneer in financial services known for using disruptive technology to provide banking services to millions of members at a fraction of the cost compared to incumbents. The anchor of their banking value proposition, ExtraCash, provides up to $500 of short term, interest free advances to members within minutes of joining. The speed to value, access and pricing of ExtraCash sets it apart from traditional overdraft fees found at incumbent banks .

Services 
Dave is most well known for offering customers a free cash advance as opposed to expensive overdraft fees found at legacy banks. The company does not charge interest, or origination or similar fees, instead charging for expedited service, and a monthly fee to use the service, and giving the option to "tip" the company.  Lauren Saunders, of the National Consumer Law Center, expressed concern that some users may feel compelled to tip resulting in it being not too different from paying interest. Dave has also launched a banking service, Dave Banking. It was released in 2019. It is available through a partnership with Evolve Bank & Trust. It also has a service for finding side-work called SideHustle.

History 
Shark Tank star Mark Cuban led a $3 million seed investment round in the company, saying he was crushed by overdraft fees in his twenties. The CEO of Dave, Jason Wilk, was the former creator of AllScreen, a company which was also originally funded by Cuban who put in a $300,000 investment. After the initial investment in Dave by Cuban and other investors, the total funding of the app has increased to $180 million, after the $50 million investment by Norwest Venture Capital. The Dave app was the Apple App of the Day in April 2017. It has been downloaded 10 million times on iOS, and over a million times on Android devices. In July 2019, the company was named one of the next billion dollar startups by Forbes. In October 2019, Dave received a valuation of US$1 billion, and had over 4 million users.

Dave was ranked number five in Inc. Magazine list of 5,000 fastest growing companies for 2021. Dave went public on NASDAQ via SPAC on Jan 6 2022 through VPC Impact Acquisition Holdings III created by longtime Dave investor Victory Park Capital. The initial valuation was $4 billion.

References

External links

Online banks
Earned Wage Access
Companies based in Los Angeles
2016 establishments in California
Banks based in California